Golden–Kilfeacle GAA club is located in the parish of Golden and Kilfeacle it has many famous hurlers that include Daniel Quealy who is an up and coming prospect for Tipperary keep an eye out lads, five miles from Cashel in County Tipperary, Ireland. The club plays hurling and Gaelic football and is one of the few clubs in West Tipperary to win both the West Tipperary Senior Hurling and Football Championships. The club was known in the past as the Golden Fontenoys, named in memory of the Franco-Irish army soldiers who took the field at the Battle of Fontenoy in 1745. Inter-county player William "Bill" O'Donnell played with the Fontenoys in the 1930s. He later transferred to Éire Óg Annacarty, where he was headmaster of the school in Annacarty. O'Donnell was a member of the Tipperary team that won the All-Ireland Senior Hurling Championship in 1937 when the final was played in Killarney.

Other inter-county players include Joe Fogarty in the 1960s, Ned O'Donnell in the 1970s, John Looby who was a minor of inter-county fame in the same decade and in more recent times, Daniel Currivan & Jim Bob McCarthy also played for Tipperary. Daniel Currivan receiving 2 Minor All Ireland medals in this period of time

The club's most successful hurling team was that of a period in the late 1960s and early 1970s when the West Tipperary Divisional Senior hurling Championship was won after 35 years of lost endeavour. The first victory was recorded in 1969, and again in 1972, which was the last occasion the club took the laurels. A football resurgence took hold in the 1980s and 1990s when in a ten-year period, four Divisional Senior Football Championships were annexed And a fifth was won jointly with Rockwell Rovers under the name of Golden-Rockwell.

Achievements
 West Tipperary Senior Football Championship (5) 1980 (with Rockwell Rovers), 1986, 1988, 1995, 1996
 West Tipperary Senior Hurling Championship (3) 1969, 1972, 2004 (with Éire Óg Annacarty)
 Tipperary Intermediate Football Championship (1) 1982
 West Tipperary Intermediate Football Championship (4) 1977, 1982, 2016, 2022
 Tipperary Intermediate Hurling Championship (1) 1995
 West Tipperary Intermediate Hurling Championship (4) 1980, 1982, 1990, 1995,2019
 Tipperary Junior A Football Championship (2) 1979, 2015
 West Tipperary Junior A Football Championship (6) 1940 (as Golden), 1961, 1975, 1976, 1979, 2015
 Tipperary Junior B Football Championship (1) 2010
 West Tipperary Junior B Football Championship (2) 1995, 2010
 West Tipperary Junior A Hurling Championship (5) 1935 (as Golden), 1943 (as Golden), 1954, 1965, 1978
 South Tipperary Junior A Hurling Championship (1) 1918 (as Golden)
 West Tipperary Junior B Hurling Championship (2) 2009, 2013
 West Tipperary Under-21 A Football Championship (1) 1998
 Tipperary Under-21 B Football Championship (2) 1995, 2007
 West Tipperary Under-21 B Football Championship (6) 1993, 1995, 2001, 2007, 2011, 2016
 Tipperary Under-21 A Hurling Championship (1) 1998
 West Tipperary Under-21 A Hurling Championship (3) 1969 (with Galtee Rovers) as Suir Rovers), 1997, 1998
 West Tipperary Under-21 B Hurling Championship (4) 1994, 2001, 2007, 2012
 Tipperary Minor A Football Championship (1) 2016 (with Galtee Rovers) 
 West Tipperary Minor A Football Championship (10) 1952 (with Galtee Rovers), 1961 (with Galtee Rovers), 1962 (with Galtee Rovers),  1984, 1985, 1995, 1996, 2011, 2015 (with Galtee Rovers), 2016 (with Galtee Rovers)
 West Tipperary Minor B Football Championship (8) 1987, 1990, 1993, 1999, 2007, 2009, 2010, 2014
 West Tipperary Minor A Hurling Championship (6) 1936 (as Golden), 1941 (with Kickhams as Invincibles), 1948, 1967, 1969, 1997
 West Tipperary Minor B Hurling Championship (6) 1986, 1987, 1992, 2003, 2009, 2010

Notable players
 John Leamy
 Josh Keane
 Bill O'Donnell

References

External links
Tipperary GAA site

Gaelic games clubs in County Tipperary
Hurling clubs in County Tipperary
Gaelic football clubs in County Tipperary